Mukhammadkodir Toshtemirov (born 17 September 2001) is an Uzbekistani weightlifter. He won the silver medal in the men's 81kg event at the 2020 Asian Weightlifting Championships held in Tashkent, Uzbekistan. He also won the gold medal in his event at the 2021 Junior World Weightlifting Championships, also held in Tashkent, Uzbekistan.

In 2018, he won the silver medal in the 77kg event at the Summer Youth Olympics held in Buenos Aires, Argentina. That year, he also competed in the men's 73 kg event at the 2018 World Weightlifting Championships held in Ashgabat, Turkmenistan. He also competed in men's 81kg event at the 2019 World Weightlifting Championships held in Pattaya, Thailand.

He could have received the continental slot for Asia in the men's 81kg event to represented Uzbekistan at the 2020 Summer Olympics in Tokyo, Japan but he was not selected as Uzbekistan was restricted to two competitors per gender due to past doping violations.

He won the gold medal in the men's 81kg Snatch event at the 2021 Islamic Solidarity Games held in Konya, Turkey. He won the bronze medal in the men's 81kg event with a total lift of 354kg.

He won the bronze medal in the men's 81kg event at the 2022 Asian Weightlifting Championships held in Manama, Bahrain. He competed in the men's 81kg event at the 2022 World Weightlifting Championships in Bogotá, Colombia.

References

External links 
 
 

Living people
2001 births
Place of birth missing (living people)
Uzbekistani male weightlifters
Weightlifters at the 2018 Summer Youth Olympics
Islamic Solidarity Games competitors for Uzbekistan
Islamic Solidarity Games medalists in weightlifting
21st-century Uzbekistani people